Musë Prelvukaj is a Kosovar artist born in Martinaj, near Gusinje and Plav in what is now Montenegro, on December 25, 1950.

Life
After finishing elementary school in Martinaj and Gusinje, he enrolled at the Fine Arts division of the High School of the Arts in Peć in 1971 followed by a graphic design course at the Academy of Figurative Arts in Pristina. He took a job at a trade school known as the SH.M.T. "28 Nëntori" (named after November 28, Albania's independence day) in 1973, organizing volunteer and professional activities there. In the 1990s, he began exhibiting student artwork there on national holidays, receiving peer awards for his efforts in 1996 and 2005. From 2003 to 2008, he served on a trade school development task force. He has reviewed several art textbooks for primary and sedoncary schools. As an artist in his own right, he has participated in 50 exhibitions at home and abroad, headlined three solo exhibitions, and co-authored a book. He is part of the Association of Kosovo Figurative Artists (ShAFK) and a sister Association of Figurative Artists among Albanians in Montenegro (ShAF shqiptar në Mal të Zi).

Works have been published, and have been reviewed by publications such as Rilindja, Zëri i Rinisë, Bota e Re, Fjala, Shkëndija, Bujku, Sheshi, Kosova Sot, Zëri, Koha Ditore, Bota Sot, Koha Javore, Lajm, Ekskluzive, and Kronika e Ulqinit.

Musa Prelvukaj is an active graphic designer whose work includes book covers, illustrations, tickets, packaging, etc. He has also reviewed books on fine arts by other authors.

Group exhibitions
 Young ShAFK Exhibition, 1978
 Annual ShAFK Exhibition: 1978, 1979
 Drawing Biennials: 1979, 1981, 1983, 1985, 1987, 1989, 1991, 2000, 2004, 2006, 2006, 2008, 2010
 Pristina ShAF Exhibition: 1980, 1981, 1982, 1983, 1985
 Youth Salon: 1982, 1984, 1986
 Exhibition of Four Artists at ShAFK, 1983
 Academy of the Arts 10th Anniversary Exhibition, 1983
 Exhibition at the "Batlava Lake" artist colony, Podujevo, 1985
 Spring Exhibition: 1985, 1989, 1991, 1992, 1994
 Fall Exhibition: 1995, 1996, 1997, 1998, 1999, 2000, 2001, 2003, 2004, 2005, 2006
 Exhibition: Kosovar Golgotha, 1999
 Exhibition of Albanian artists, Lugano, Switzerland, 2000
 Charity Exhibition for Children Maimed and Orphaned by the Kosovo War, 2001
 Exhibition at international arts and letters conference honoring poet Fahredin Gunga's "Kepi i shpresës së mirë" ("Cape of Good Hope"), Mitrovica, 2002
 Exhibition on the 125th Anniversary of the League of Prizren, Pristina, 2003
 Exhibition on Albanians in Montenegro, traveling through Ulcinj, Tuzi, Cetinje, Shkodër, Tirana: 2003, 2004
 June Exhibition – Pristina Day: 2001, 2002, 2003, 2005, 2006
 International peace Exhibition – Paris, 2003
 "Arti dhe natyra – Landart" ("Art and Nature: Landscape Art") Exhibition, Pristina, 2003
 Albanian Culture Week in North Macedonia (Skopje and Gostivar), 2006
 "Muslim Mulliqi" Award Exhibition, Kosova National Art Gallery, Pristina, 2006.

Dedicated exhibitions
 Exhibition at the Ministry of Culture Gallery – Prishtinë, 2002
 Exhibition at the Cultural Center – Prizren, 2007
 Exhibition at the National Library of Kosovo - Pristina, 2015

Awards
 Graphic Design Prize, Student Exhibition, Academy of Figurative Arts, Pristina, 1975
 Drawing Prize, Youth Salon, 1982
 Special Drawing Prize, "28 Nëntori" Hall, Pristina, 1998
 Grand Prix, 15th International Drawing Biennial (Kosova National Art Gallery - SHAFK), Pristina, 2010

Publications
 SHMT "28 nëntori" Prishtinë, Pristina (2006); 
 Shkolla e Mesme Teknike "28 nëntori," Pristina (2012);

References

External links
 http://www.albanianarts.com/aart/artwork_by_category.php?id=0000000015
 http://discoveralbania.blogspot.com/
 http://www.albanianarts.com/aart/artists_preview.php?id=0000000153
 http://www.kultplus.com/?id=4&l=11634

1950 births
Kosovan painters
Living people